Raymond Park (born 23 August 1974) is a Scottish actor and stuntman. He is best known for physically portraying Darth Maul in Star Wars: Episode I – The Phantom Menace and Solo: A Star Wars Story, along with a motion capture performance in the final season of Star Wars: The Clone Wars, Toad in X-Men, Snake Eyes in G.I. Joe: The Rise of Cobra and G.I. Joe: Retaliation, and Edgar on Heroes.

Early life
Park was born on 23 August 1974 in Glasgow, Scotland. At the age of seven, he moved with his family to London, England.

Park was introduced to martial arts by his father, who was a fan of Bruce Lee, and began training in the traditional Chinese Northern Shaolin Kung Fu when he was 7 years old. He also started practising wushu. When he was 15, Park went to Malaysia to improve his skills. From 1991 to 1996, he was a member of the British national wushu team. Park went on to compete in martial arts tournaments around the world including the World Wushu Championships before turning his attention to acting in the late 1990s.

Career
Park began working in films as a stunt double for the film Mortal Kombat: Annihilation, doing the stunts for both Robin Shou and James Remar. Park also did some cameos as monsters, including Baraka. All of these were non-speaking roles.

In 1999, Park appeared in Star Wars: Episode I – The Phantom Menace, as the Sith Assassin Maul. While the character only had three lines, Park's voice was dubbed over with that of actor Peter Serafinowicz. From his work on Star Wars, Park was cast in a cameo role in Fanboys as a Skywalker Ranch security guard who says, "Time for you to get mauled, boy," as he pulls out two nightsticks.

In addition to this acting work, he has also been Christopher Walken's fight stunt double for the film Sleepy Hollow. Park appeared in the scene where Walken's character, the Headless Horseman, murders the Killian family and Brom Van Brunt, among others.

Park had his first real speaking part in X-Men as Toad.

In December 2007, Park was confirmed for the role of Snake Eyes in G.I. Joe: The Rise of Cobra and G.I. Joe: Retaliation involving a variation of the international G.I. Joe force who fought the minions of Cobra in the comics.

He worked with comic book creator-turned-filmmaker Kevin VanHook in the film Slayer, starring in the dual roles of acrobatic twin vampires. This film also saw him appearing again with Sleepy Hollow co-star Casper Van Dien.

ComiCon 2007 saw the premiere of the teaser trailer for The Descendants, another comic book adaptation based on an independent comic by writer Joey Andrade.

Park appeared as Edgar in the fourth season of the television series Heroes.

Park was also included in the motion capture team of the 2008 James Bond video game adaptation of Quantum of Solace.

In the comic book-styled film Hellbinders, he plays a soulless mercenary who, along with an elite assassin (Johnny Yong Bosch) and the last remaining member of the long dead Knights Templar, Esteban Cueto, must overcome their innate mistrust of each other and join forces to defeat Legion before it opens the gates of hell itself and overruns the entire world. Park narrated on 26 February 2010 the introduction of The FireBreather, a car from Classic Design Concepts in Detroit Autorama 2010, which appears in Park's supernatural thriller Jinn.

In 2011, Park guest starred in the TV series Nikita as the London Guardian, Brendan. He reprised his role as Maul in Solo: A Star Wars Story (2018), with Sam Witwer providing the voice.

In 2019 during Star Wars Celebration, Dave Filoni revealed that Park reprised his role as Maul for the seventh and final season of Star Wars: The Clone Wars through a motion capture performance, with Witwer again providing the voice.

In 2022, Park was reportedly set to originally reprise his role as Maul again in the Disney+ streaming series Obi-Wan Kenobi, but his character's inclusion was dropped late into development; sources claim that Park went as far to perform some stunt training and shoot some footage, though other sources claim that Park's scenes consisted solely on test footage before the character was written out.

Filmography

Film

Television

References

External links

 
 
 
 

1974 births
Living people
20th-century British male actors
21st-century British male actors
British stunt performers
British wushu practitioners
Male actors from Glasgow
Male actors from London
Masked actors
People from Govan
Scottish male film actors
Scottish male television actors
Scottish stunt performers